Buxbaumia was a bryological journal published in the Netherlands, beginning in 1947.  It was named for the moss genus Buxbaumia.  In 1970, the journal became Lindbergia and Buxbaumiella.

References 

Botany journals
Publications established in 1947
Publications disestablished in 1970
1947 establishments in the Netherlands
Bryology